Elizabeth Ann Coker (born 11 June 1962) is an Australian politician. She is a member of the Australian Labor Party (ALP) and has been a member of the House of Representatives since the 2019 federal election, representing the Victorian seat of Corangamite. She previously served as the mayor of the Surf Coast Shire. Coker won the 2022 Australian federal election with a 6.5% swing to the Australian Labor Party (ALP).

Early life 
Coker was born in Melbourne on 11 June 1962. Her mother Frances Mann worked as a nurse and her father Jack Coker was a senior public servant with the Australian Broadcasting Control Board. She grew up in the suburb of Beaumaris, later moving with her family to Port Macquarie, New South Wales where Coker's activism began.

In her first speech to parliament, Coker revealed she vandalised a real estate sign with her then-boyfriend in Port Macquarie, in an act of defiance against deforestation. She said she has "moved on" from spray-painting signs, but understands people who are frustrated by government inaction on climate change.

Coker holds a Bachelor of Arts from the University of New England and Bachelor of Letters from Deakin University, as well as a Diploma of Education from Monash University. Prior to entering politics, she worked briefly as a schoolteacher in outer Melbourne and held various positions in journalism, communications and public relations, including as a manager at the Victorian Department of Education. She completed a journalism cadetship at the Geelong Advertiser.

Politics
Coker was first elected to the Surf Coast Shire council in 2008, for the Anglesea ward. She served as mayor between 2009 and 2010, and again from 2012 to 2013.

House of Representatives
Coker won the ultra-marginal seat of Corangamite at the 2019 Australian federal election, defeating Liberal incumbent Sarah Henderson. Coker had unsuccessfully contested the seat at the 2016 Australian federal election. The 2022 Australian Federal Election was won by the Australian Labor Party (ALP), winning with 77 seats  forming majority in the lower house. As a result, Coker won the ultra-marginal seat of Corangamite.

Following a redistribution of electoral boundaries in 2021 by the Australian Electoral Commission (AEC), Coker no longer resides in the electorate she represents. The coastal towns of Anglesea and Aireys Inlet, where she resides, are now incorporated into the Division of Wannon.

References

External links 
 Official campaign website
 

1962 births
Living people
Australian Labor Party members of the Parliament of Australia
Members of the Australian House of Representatives
Members of the Australian House of Representatives for Corangamite
Women members of the Australian House of Representatives
21st-century Australian politicians
21st-century Australian women politicians
University of New England (Australia) alumni
Monash University alumni
Deakin University alumni
Labor Left politicians
Australian schoolteachers
Australian public relations people
Australian journalists